Prince of Yulin may refer to:

Xiao Zhaoye (473–494), Liang dynasty emperor 
Li Ke (619–653), Tang dynasty prince